Norrøn (Norse) is the fifth full-length album by the Norwegian Viking metal band Einherjer and the first after the band reunited. It was released on 9 September 2011 through Indie Recordings.

Track listing

Credits
Gerhard Storesund - Drums, Keyboards, synthesizer
Frode Glesnes - Guitars, Bass, Vocals
Aksel Herløe - Guitars

References

Einherjer albums
2011 albums